The following are the national records in Olympic weightlifting in Belgium. Records are maintained in each weight class for the snatch lift, clean and jerk lift, and the total for both lifts by the Royal Belgian Weightlifting Federation.

Current records
Key to tables:

Men

Women

Historical records

Men (1998–2018)

Women (1998–2018)

References
General
Belgian records – Men 
Belgian records – Women 
Specific

External links
Ligue Francophone des Poids et Haltères (LFPH)

Belgium
weightlifting
weightlifting